Madeleine Hamilton Smith (29 March 1835 – 12 April 1928) was a 19th-century Glasgow socialite who was the accused in a sensational murder trial in Scotland in 1857.

Background

Smith was the first child (of five) of an upper-middle-class family in Glasgow; her father, James Smith (1808–1863) was a wealthy architect, and her mother, Elizabeth, was the daughter of leading neo-classical architect David Hamilton. She was born at the family home 81 Wellington Place in Glasgow.

In 1855 the family moved from India Street to 7 Blythswood Square, Glasgow, living in the lower half of a house owned by her maternal uncle, David Hamilton, a yarn merchant. The house stands at the crown of the major development led by William Harley on Blythswood Hill, and they also had a country property, "Rowaleyn", near Helensburgh.

Smith broke the strict Victorian conventions of the time when, as a young woman in early 1855, she began a secret love affair with Pierre Emile L'Angelier, some ten years her senior, an apprentice nurseryman who originally came from the Channel Islands. He worked as a packing clerk in a warehouse at 10 Bothwell Street nearby.

The pair would meet late at night, at Smith's bedroom window and also engaged in voluminous correspondence. During one of their infrequent meetings alone, she lost her virginity to L'Angelier.

Smith's parents, unaware of the affair with L'Angelier (whom Smith had promised to marry) found a suitable fiancé for her within the Glasgow upper-middle class, William Harper Minnoch.

Smith attempted to break her connection with L'Angelier and, in February 1857, asked him to return the letters she had written to him. Instead, L'Angelier threatened to use the letters to expose her and force her to marry him. She was soon observed in a druggist's office, ordering arsenic, which she signed for as M.H. Smith.

Early on the morning of 23 March 1857, L'Angelier died from arsenic poisoning. He is buried in the Ramshorn Cemetery on Ingram Street in Glasgow.

After his death, Madeleine Smith's numerous letters were found in the house where he lodged, and she was arrested and charged with his murder.

Trial

At trial, Smith was defended by advocate John Inglis, the future Lord Glencorse. Toxicological evidence, confirming that the victim had died of arsenic poisoning, was given by Andrew Douglas Maclagan.

In the trial the two most positive elements in her defence were the two druggists both testifying that they coloured their arsenic to avoid accident (and the autopsy having not found this), and L'Angelier's valet testifying that L'Angelier had considered suicide at least once. There was therefore a strong suggestion of suicide.

Although the circumstantial evidence pointed towards her guilt (Smith had made purchases of arsenic in the weeks leading up to L'Angelier's death, and had a clear motive) the jury returned one verdict of not guilty on the first count and a verdict of "not proven" on the second count.

Crucial to the case was the chronology of certain letters from Smith to l'Angelier, and as the letters themselves were undated, the case hinged to some extent on the envelopes. One letter in particular depended on the correct interpretation of the date of the postmark, which was unfortunately illegible, and attracted some caustic comments from the judge; but the vast majority of these postmarks were quite clearly struck. It transpired that when the police searched L'Angelier's room, many of Smith's letters were found without their envelopes and were then hurriedly collected and stuck into whichever envelopes came to hand.

Later life

Following the scandal her family were forced to quit their Glasgow home and their country villa Rowaleyn in Rhu and moved to Bridge of Allan in central Scotland. They moved again in 1860 to Old Polmont. Her father died in Polmont in 1863 aged 55, broken by the whole affair.

On 4 July 1861, she married an artist named George Wardle, William Morris's business manager. They had one son (Thomas, born 1864) and one daughter (Mary, called "Kitten", born 1863). For a time, she became involved with the Fabian Society in London, and was an enthusiastic organiser.  As she was known by her new married name, not everyone knew who she was, but a few did.

After many years of marriage, she and her husband separated in 1889 and Madeleine moved to New York City. Around 1916, she married a second time to William A. Sheehy and this marriage lasted until his death in 1926.

Later theories
As in the case of Lizzie Borden, scholars and amateur criminologists have spent decades going over the details of the case.

Most modern scholars believe that Smith committed the crime and the only thing that saved her from a guilty verdict and a death sentence was that no eyewitness could prove that Smith and l'Angellier had met in the weeks before his death.

After the trial, The Scotsman ran a small article stating that a witness had come forward claiming that a young male and female were seen outside Smith's house on the night of l'Angellier's death. However, the trial was already in progress, and the witness could not be questioned during it.

Dramatisations
Smith's story was the basis for several plays and the distinguished David Lean film Madeleine (1950), starring Ann Todd, Ivan Desny and Leslie Banks. Jack House's book Square Mile of Murder (1961), which contains a section on Smith, formed the basis for a BBC television version in 1980. A television play based upon the case, Killer in Close-Up: The Trial Of Madeleine Smith, written by George F. Kerr, was also produced by Sydney television station ABN-2, broadcast on 13 August 1958.

The case was an inspiration for Wilkie Collins' novel The Law and the Lady (1875), though the only main similar features were the problem of the Scottish "Not Proven" verdict and arsenic poisoning as a means for murder.

Katherine Cornell portrayed Smith in the play Dishonored Lady. TCM  gives the date of the play as 1928; the Internet Broadway Database has it opening on Broadway in 1930.  In the early 1930s, MGM starred Joan Crawford, Nils Asther and Robert Montgomery in a film called Letty Lynton, which was based on a 1931 novel of the same title by Marie Adelaide Belloc Lowndes. This film closely follows Madeleine's story, except that Crawford's character is never charged and, in an example of pre-code Hollywood, gets away with murder. The film is not presently available due to a suit filed shortly after the film's release in 1932. The suit successfully claimed that the film script bears too close a resemblance to the script of the play, Dishonored Lady. In 1947, the play was adapted into a film of the same name starring Hedy Lamarr.

The case was again dramatized in 1952 for Mutual Radio in an episode of The Black Museum titled "The Small White Boxes".

Other novels based on the case include The House in Queen Anne's Square (1920) by William Darling Lyell, Lovers All Untrue (1970) by Norah Lofts, and Alas, for Her That Met Me! (1976) by Mary Ann Ashe (pseudonym of Christianna Brand). Alanna Knight's Murder in Paradise (2008) includes Madeleine Smith, William Morris and George Wardle as peripheral characters, including a story of how Madeleine met George.

From 1976 to 1989 Madeleine Smith was one of the figures in the Chamber of Horrors section in the Edinburgh Wax Museum on the Royal Mile.

The Madeleine Smith case was partly dramatized with actors reading her letters and a draft of a letter by Pierre Emile L'Angelier on an episode of the 2022 BBC Radio podcast series Lucy Worsley's Lady Killers.

References

Sources
 Campbell, Jimmy Powdrell. Rewriting The Madeleine Smith Story. 2007 
 Diamond, Michael (2003) Victorian Sensation London: Anthem. . pp. 172–176
 MacGowan, Douglas. The Strange Affair of Madeleine Smith: Victorian Scotland's Trial of the Century. (Mercat Press, 2007). .
 MacGowan, Douglas. Murder in Victorian Scotland: The Trial of Madeleine Smith. (1999) 
 House, Jack (1961) Square Mile of Murder. Edinburgh: W. & R. Chambers
 Mackay, James.  Scotland's Post  (2000) Glasgow

Further reading
 Geary, Rick (2006) "A Treasury of Victorian Murder: The Case of Madeleine Smith". New York: NBM.
 Gordon, Eleanor & Nair, Gwyneth (2009) Murder and morality in Victorian Britain: The Story of Madeleine Smith. Manchester: Manchester University Press
 Hartman, M. S. (1979) "Murder for respectability : The case of Madeleine Smith". Victorian Studies, 16:4, 381–400. Publisher: Indiana University Press.
 Morland, Nigel (US: 1988) "That Nice Miss Smith"
 Glasgow's Blythswood by Graeme Smith, 2021 https://blythswoodsmith.co.uk/

External links
A Most Curious Murder – The Madeleine Smith Story
The Madeleine Smith Story at the Crime Library
Madeleine Wardle in later life
Contemporary description of the accused; testimony
Contemporary description of the accused; correspondence between her and the deceased

1835 births
1857 in Scotland
Anglo-Scots
People associated with Glasgow
Scottish socialites
Murder in Scotland
Scots law
Trials in Scotland
1928 deaths
Place of birth missing
People acquitted of murder
Members of the Fabian Society
1857 murders in the United Kingdom